F-Minus was an American hardcore punk band formed in 1995 in Huntington Beach, California, United States, started by Jen Johnson and Brad Logan. F-Minus was known for their dueling male and female vocals in songs that were sometimes as short as 12 seconds ("Fuck You O.C."). Before breaking up in 2004, their last album was recorded by Steve Albini. Throughout their career, they covered such bands as Antidote, Black Randy and the Metro Squad, 7 Seconds, Negative Approach, and Agnostic Front. Brad Logan currently runs his own record label Blacknoise, and is also member of the New York band Leftöver Crack. Jen Johnson currently is the designer and owner of clothing label E.C. Star, and also is a member of the California band Ammunition Affair.

Members

Final line up
Brad Logan- vocals, guitar
Erica Daking- vocals, guitar
Joe Steinbrick- bass
Adam Zuckert- drums

Former members
Jen Johnson- vocals, bass
Sarah Lee- guitar
Chris Lagerborg- drums
John Guerra- drums
JP Otto- drums

Discography

Albums
Self Titled LP/CD (Hellcat, 1999)
Suburban Blight LP/CD (Hellcat, 2001)
Wake Up Screaming LP/CD (Hellcat, 2003)
Won't Bleed Me / Failed Society CD (Alternative Tentacles, 2005)

EPs
Voice of Treason Cassette (Self Released, 1996)
Failed Society 7" (Hellcat, 1997)
Won't Bleed Me 7" (Pelado, 1997)
Failed Society / Won't Bleed Me Cassette (Self Released, 1997)
Split With Crack Rock Steady 7 - Baby Jesus Sliced Up In The Manger 10" (Knife or Death, 2001)
Sweating Blood 7" (Bridge 9, 2003)

Compilations
Give Em' The Boot Volume 1 CD (Hellcat, 1997)
Old Skars and Upstarts CD/LP (Alive, 1997)
Give Em' The Boot Volume 2 CD (Hellcat, 1999)
No Time To Kill (Checkmate, 1999)
Vans Off The Wall Volume 3 CD (Vans, 2000)
Tomorrow Seems So Hopeless CD (Eyeball, 2000)
Give Em' The Boot Volume 3 CD (Hellcat, 2002)
Against Police Injustice CD (Non-Commercial, 2003)
Punk O' Rama Volume 8 CD (Epitaph, 2003)
Give Em' The Boot Volume 4 CD (Hellcat, 2004)
Give Em' The Boot DVD (Hellcat, 2005)
The Kids Are Gonna Pay Split (In Your Face (7 Seconds Cover))(2006)

See also
Leftöver Crack

References

External links
Official website 
F-Minus on Myspace
Blacknoise Records
Hellcat Records
E.C. Star
Ammunition Affair

Alternative Tentacles artists
Hardcore punk groups from California
Hellcat Records artists
Musical groups established in 1995
Musical groups from Orange County, California
American crust and d-beat groups